Hyperloop Transportation Technologies, also known as HyperloopTT, is an American research company formed using a crowd collaboration approach (a mix of team collaboration and crowdsourcing) to develop around the world commercial transportation systems based on the Hyperloop concept.

The concept of the Hyperloop was popularized in 2013 by Elon Musk, not affiliated with HyperloopTT.

HyperloopTT also plans to build slower, urban Hyperloops for inter-suburb travel.

History

JumpStarter, Inc 
The company was founded by JumpStarter, Inc., utilizing the company's crowdfunding and collaboration platform JumpStartFund.

In 2013, HyperloopTT announced partnered with Ansys, GloCal Network and UCLA's Architecture & Urban Design program to aide in the early-stage development of feasibility testing, supply chain management and station experience.

Early routes 

The company was not focused on the Los Angeles-to-San Francisco route that was the baseline of the Hyperloop Alpha design from 2013, and considered other routes.

In 2015, HyperloopTT signed and agreement with GROW Holdings, the developer of Quay Valley, California, to construct a  demonstration track beginning in 2016.

Also in August 2015, HyperloopTT announced partnerships with international engineering design and construction giant Aecom and Oerlikon, the world's oldest vacuum technology specialist. AECOM began providing services to HyperloopTT for the design of the full-scale Quay Valley prototype track.

Construction on this demonstration track in Quay Valley never started as GROW Holdings lacked the funds to continue the new community development and stopped all development in the valley.

Employee growth 

The company's singular collaboration model meant that rather than employees, HyperloopTT has established a network of contributors all working a minimum of 10 hours per week in exchange for future equity.

Initial development was done by approximately 100 engineers compensated solely in stock options. This initial team was primarily based within the United States. The company has assembled a team of community members, attracting high level engineers and contributing corporations.

HyperloopTT saw a large growth in contributor numbers in 2015, in February the company had grown to nearly 200 contributors
and by November had more than doubled to just under 500 people.

HyperloopTT continued growing and began hiring full-time executives, to help manage the contribution of the crowd.

Today, HyperloopTT boasts more than 800 contributors in 40 countries with 50 full-time employees and more than 50 corporate partners.

Early agreements 

In 2016 then HyperloopTT CEO, Dirk Ahlborn, announced an agreement with the Slovak government to perform feasibility studies regarding routes connecting Vienna, Austria to Bratislava, Slovakia, and Bratislava to Budapest, Hungary. Total costs for this project are estimated to be . The resulting annual system capacity is projected to be 10 million passengers. The company announced in March 2016 that they would be using passive Inductrack systems for their titular Hyperloop. However, in August 2018 the agreement expired after the Office of the Deputy Prime Minister and HyperloopTT didn't reach an agreement to continue the project.

In September 2017, HyperloopTT signed an agreement with the Andhra Pradesh State Government in India to build a Hyperloop between the cities of Amaravati and Vijaywada. The two-phase project would begin with a 6-month feasibility study which would be followed by actual construction.

In July 2018, HyperloopTT announced an agreement to create a joint venture with the government of China's southwestern province of Guizhou to construct a 10 km long Hyperloop track in the city of Tongren.

Funding 
In 2016, HyperloopTT had raised $31.8 million in cash and received $77 million in man-hours, services rendered, land rights usage and future in-kind investments.

HyperloopTT's collaboration model has enabled significant advancement with significantly less financial resources as compared to competitors. A 2020 Forbes article stated that HyperloopTT had received a total of $50 million in-cash investments since founding, a small figure compared to Virgin Hyperloop's $350 million. Despite the disparity in investments, HyperloopTT's Great Lakes project is the closest commercial Hyperloop project to operation.

Current prototypes 
HyperloopTT is currently operating or designing four prototypes.

Toulouse 

Since 2017 HyperloopTT has an agreement with the city council of Toulouse and established a research and development center to test hyperloop-related technologies at the Francazal Airport, in the heart of the renowned "Aerospace Valley".

Construction began on the 320-meter long test system in April 2018. The completed test-track is 4 meters in diameter making it the world's only full-scale hyperloop test track.

Abu Dhabi 
In November 2016, HyperloopTT signed an agreement with the Abu Dhabi Department of Municipal Affairs and Transportation to conduct a feasibility study for a hyperloop system connecting the cities of Abu Dhabi and Al Ain. In 2017, HyperloopTT and the Office of His Highness Sheikh Falah Bin Zayed Al Nahyan signed a strategic partnership agreement accelerating the development of the system to create an innovative infrastructure in line with the Abu Dhabi 2030 vision.

In 2018, HyperloopTT and Aldar Properties signed an agreement to develop the first 10-kilometer section of a system between Abu Dhabi and Dubai. The system is expected to be operational by 2023.

Great Lakes 
In February 2018, HyperloopTT announced a public-private partnership with the Northeast Ohio Areawide Coordinating Agency (NOACA) metropolitan planning organization and the Illinois Department of Transportation for the development of the United States’ first interstate hyperloop system in the Great Lakes megaregion. The project which initially only focused on connecting Cleveland to Chicago expanded in 2019 to include Pittsburgh as HyperloopTT looks to create the first part of a national network that would connect the midwest to the east coast through Pittsburgh.

The Great Lakes project resulted in the world's most comprehensive hyperloop feasibility study demonstrating that the system would, “not only be a boon to communities along the travel corridors but also would be a strong business investment.” The study projected development costs of about $40 billion, but would see a $30 billion profit in the first 25 years of operation. The study also predicted a 931,745 increase in jobs, $74.8 billion increase in property values, and an expanded tax base that would generate $12.7 billion in government revenue from 2025 to 2050.

The report also projected that the renewable powered emission-free hyperloop system proposed by HyperloopTT would eliminate 143 million tons of carbon dioxide emissions by replacing air, car, and rail transit along the corridor.

Hamburg 
In 2018, HyperloopTT announced the creation of a joint venture with Hamburger Hafen und Logistik Aktiengesellschaft (HHLA)  the leading container terminal operator in the Port of Hamburg. The project aims to build a 100-meter test track to test the cargo system before expanding the system to connect the port with an inland container yard to alleviate port congestion. In 2019, HyperloopTT announced a partnership with the Gaussin Group, a French autonomous vehicle company, to create the AIV HyperloopTT electric self-driving vehicles that will cost-efficiently carry and transfer containers for the fully automated Hyperloop Cargo System.

Challenges 
HTT has been bold in making forward-looking statements, such as:
 Feasibility study with UCLA by mid-2015
 Initial Public Offering in 2015
 Demonstration Track in 2016
 New facility in Toulouse, France Jan 2017

See also 
 List of crowdsourcing projects

References

External links 

Hyperloop
Technology companies of the United States
Transportation companies of the United States
Transportation companies based in California
Technology companies based in Greater Los Angeles
American companies established in 2013
Transport companies established in 2013
2013 establishments in California
Privately held companies based in California